This is the electoral history of Ronald Reagan. Reagan, a Republican, served as the 40th president of the United States (1981–89) and earlier as the 33rd governor of California (1967–75).

Having been elected twice to the presidency, Reagan reshaped the Republican Party, led the modern conservative movement, and altered the political dynamic of the United States. His 1980 presidential campaign stressed some of his fundamental principles: lower taxes to stimulate the economy, less government interference in people's lives, states' rights, and a strong national defense.

During his presidency, Reagan pursued policies that reflected his personal belief in individual freedom, brought changes domestically, both to the U.S. economy and expanded military, and contributed to the end of the Cold War. Termed the Reagan Revolution, his presidency would reinvigorate American morale, reinvigorate the American economy and reduce American reliance upon government.

1966 California gubernatorial election

California Republicans were impressed with Reagan's political views and charisma after his "Time for choosing" speech, he announced in late 1965, his campaign for Governor of California in 1966. He won the Republican primary with nearly 65% of the vote, not including write-in votes, defeating four other candidates, including former San Francisco mayor George Christopher. Although he did not run in the Democratic primary, Reagan received 27,422 votes as a write-in candidate. Not including write-in candidates, 2,570,396 total votes were cast in the Democratic primary, so Reagan's votes would have comprised about 1% of the total Democratic primary votes. In Reagan's campaign, he emphasized two main themes: "to send the welfare bums back to work", and, in reference to burgeoning anti-war and anti-establishment student protests at the University of California at Berkeley, "to clean up the mess at Berkeley". Ronald Reagan accomplished in 1966 what US Senator William F. Knowland in 1958 and former Vice-President Richard M. Nixon in 1962 had tried: he was elected, defeating two-term governor Edmund G. "Pat" Brown, and was sworn in as the 33rd governor of California on January 2, 1967.

Republican primary

General election

1968 presidential election

Shortly after the beginning of his term as California governor, Reagan tested the presidential waters in 1968 as part of a "Stop Nixon" movement, hoping to cut into Nixon's Southern support and be a compromise candidate if neither Nixon nor second-place Nelson Rockefeller received enough delegates to win on the first ballot at the Republican convention. However, by the time of the convention Nixon had 692 delegate votes, 25 more than he needed to secure the nomination, followed by Rockefeller with Reagan in third place.

Republican presidential primaries

1968 Republican National Convention

1970 California gubernatorial election

Despite an unsuccessful attempt to recall him in 1968, Reagan was unopposed in the Republican primary and was re-elected in 1970, defeating "Big Daddy" Jesse Unruh. He did not seek a third term in the following election cycle.

Republican primary

General election

1976 presidential election

In 1976, Reagan challenged incumbent President Gerald Ford in a bid to become the Republican Party's candidate for president. Reagan soon established himself as the conservative candidate with the support of like-minded organizations such as the American Conservative Union which became key components of his political base, while President Ford was considered a more moderate Republican. Though Reagan lost the Republican nomination, he received 307 write-in votes in New Hampshire, 388 votes as an Independent on Wyoming's ballot, and a single electoral vote from a faithless elector in the November election from the state of Washington, which Ford had won over Democratic challenger Jimmy Carter. Ford ultimately lost the general election to Carter.

Republican primaries

Republican National Convention

Electoral College vote

1980 presidential election

Reagan ran against Democratic incumbent Jimmy Carter and independent candidate John B. Anderson. He was praised by supporters for running a campaign of upbeat optimism. Aided by the Iran hostage crisis and a worsening economy at home marked by high unemployment and inflation, Reagan won the election in a massive landslide. The 1980 presidential election marked the beginning of the Reagan Era, and signified a conservative realignment in national politics. At 69 years old, Reagan was the oldest person ever to become president of the U.S. until 2017, when President Donald Trump was sworn in at the age of 70.

Republican presidential primaries

Republican National Convention

Presidential election

1984 presidential election

Reagan ran for reelection as President in 1984, running against Democrat Walter Mondale. Reagan was re-elected, receiving 58.8% of the popular vote to Mondale's 40.6%, and winning 49 of 50 states. Reagan won a record 525 electoral votes (97.6 percent of the 538 votes in the Electoral College), the most by any candidate in American history. This was the second-most lopsided presidential election in modern U.S. history after Franklin D. Roosevelt's 1936 victory over Alfred M. Landon, in which he won 98.5 percent or 523 of the (then-total) 531 electoral votes. At 73 years old, Reagan again became the oldest person elected to the presidency, breaking his own record in 1980.

Republican presidential primaries

Republican National Convention

Presidential election

See also
Reagan coalition, the combination of voters who supported Reagan and his election campaigns.
Reagan Democrat, a traditionally Democratic voter who defected from their party to support Reagan in 1980 and 1984.
Reagan's coattails, the influence of Reagan's popularity on elections other than his own, after the American political expression to "ride in on another's coattails."

Notes

References

Bibliography

Ronald Reagan
Reagan, Ronald
Reagan, Ronald